The following is a list of justices of the Arkansas Supreme Court.  Article VI, Section 1, of the Arkansas Constitution of 1836 established a Supreme Court; Section 2 declared it would consist of three judges, including a chief justice.

The Reconstruction Constitution of 1868, which placed the state under military control, added two justices; the Arkansas Constitution of 1874 rolled back the expansion, but stipulated that once the population of the state should "amount to one million, the General Assembly may, if deemed necessary, increase the number of judges of the Supreme Court to five." In 1889, the population milestone was reached, and the legislature authorized a total of five justices. Constitutional sanction of the enlargement came in 1924 with voter approval of Amendment 9, which also allowed for the future legislative creation of two additional judgeships. Act 205 of 1925 further increased the number of justices to seven.

Note: Some early justices were able to be elected to positions they were appointed to. Ark. Const., Amendment 29, adopted in 1938, prohibited state, county, and city appointees from being elected to the same position.

List of chief justices

List of associate justices

Position 2

Position 3

Position 4

Position 5

Position 6

Position 7

References

External links
 Arkansas Judiciary page on Justices, Judges and Officers of the Courts
 Supreme Court Justices | Arkansas Judiciary

 
Arkansas Supreme Court, List of Justices
Justices